The 2018 Liga Futebol Amadora is the third season of the Liga Futebol Amadora. The season began on 3 March 2018. The Primeira Divisão began on March 3 and finished on August 5, while the Segunda Divisão began on March 6 and was finished on August 6. 

All Primeira Divisão games are played at the Dili Municipal Stadium, Kampo Demokrasia, Baucau Municipal Stadium and Malibaca Yamato Stadium, while all Segunda Divisão games are played at the Kampo Demokrasia.

League table

Primeira

Segunda

See also
 2018 LFA Primeira
 2018 LFA Segunda
 2018 Taça 12 de Novembro

References

External links
Official website
Official Facebook page

Liga Futebol Amadora
Timor-Leste
2019 in Asian football